Anthony R. "Tonie" Joy is an American musician based in Baltimore, Maryland.  Joy is known for his work in various underground rock and post-hardcore bands.  He ran the independent record label Vermin Scum from 1989 until 2001.

Musical career
Having been inspired by his father Bill's early '70s acid rock band Grok and previous group The Verdicts, Joy began playing music as a teenager.  In 1986 he co-founded Moss Icon which is known as an early influence on the hardcore punk rock splinter genre known as "emotive hardcore" or emo. Moss Icon were active until 1991, briefly in 2001, and occasionally since 2007. In 1990 Joy played guitar in Breathing Walker, a band containing members of Moss Icon as well as other musicians. Shortly thereafter, following a brief period playing guitar in and contributing artwork to Lava, Joy co-founded Universal Order of Armageddon, another influential post-hardcore group. During this time Joy served as the bassist in the final lineup of the political hardcore band Born Against.

Joy's first appearance as a front man came in 1995 with The Great Unraveling, a band formed from the ashes of Universal Order of Armageddon.  After their dissolution in 1997, Joy co-founded The Convocation Of..., who, despite a period of inactivity from 2002–2005, currently remain active under the name The Convocation. Joy was an occasional member in the group Men's Recovery Project in the late 1990s. In 2010 he briefly played bass in the hard rock band The Pilgrim and in 2011 played guitar on a few tracks on the Cold Cave LP Cherish the Light Years and was a touring guitarist on their 2011 UK and EU tour. Later this year, Joy debuted his 7 piece live band called Slow Bull, the culmination of several years of solo writing and recording efforts.

References

External links
Official website

American punk rock guitarists
Living people
Men's Recovery Project members
American male guitarists
20th-century American guitarists
21st-century American guitarists
Musicians from Baltimore
20th-century American male musicians
21st-century American male musicians
Year of birth missing (living people)